Livin' on the Fault Line is the seventh studio album by the American rock band The Doobie Brothers. The album was released on August 19, 1977, by Warner Bros. Records. It is one of the few Doobie Brothers albums of the 1970s which did not produce a Top 40 hit on the Billboard Hot 100 (although "You Belong to Me" was a hit as recorded by co-author Carly Simon). Still, the album received modest critical acclaim. Tom Johnston (guitar, vocals) left the band early in the sessions. He is listed as part of the band (appearing in the inside group photo) but appears on little or none of the actual album: he wrote and sang five songs during the sessions for the album, but they were not included on the final release. Much of this consistently mellow album has a jazz tinge, and the influences of R&B are palpable throughout. The track "Little Darling (I Need You)" is a remake of the Marvin Gaye 1966 hit.

Track listing

Personnel
The Doobie Brothers:
Patrick Simmons – electric and acoustic guitars, lead and backing vocals
Jeff Baxter – electric and acoustic guitars
Michael McDonald – acoustic and electric pianos, organ, clavinet, synthesizer, lead and backing vocals
Tiran Porter – bass, backing vocals, lead vocals on "Need a Lady"
Keith Knudsen – drums, percussion, backing vocals
John Hartman – drums, percussion
Tom Johnston – guitar, vocals (listed as band member in credits but does not appear on album)

Additional Players:
Bobby LaKind – congas, backing vocals
Dan Armstrong – electric sitar solo on "Need a Lady"
Norton Buffalo – harmonica on "There's a Light"
Victor Feldman – vibes on "Livin' on the Fault Line"
Rosemary Butler – backing vocals on "Little Darling (I Need You)", "You Belong to Me" and "There's a Light"
Maureen McDonald – backing vocals on "You're Made That Way"
Ted Templeman – percussion
David Paich – string and horn arrangements on "You're Made That Way", "Little Darling (I Need You)", "You Belong to Me" and "There's a Light", string arrangement on "Nothin' But a Heartache"

Production
Producer – Ted Templeman
Production coordination – Beth Naranjo
Engineer – Donn Landee
Second engineer – Kent Nebergall
Cover photography and album design – Bruce Steinberg
Inner sleeve photo – Michael Zagaris
Aerial photo pilot – Roger Glenn
Hand-tinting – Kristin Sundbom
Management – Bruce Cohn
Publicity – David Gest

Charts

References

1977 albums
The Doobie Brothers albums
Warner Records albums
Albums produced by Ted Templeman
Albums recorded at Sunset Sound Recorders
Albums recorded at United Western Recorders